Butyriboletus ventricosus is a pored mushroom in the family Boletaceae. An Asian species, it was originally described in 2013 as a species of Boletus, but transferred to the newly created genus Butyriboletus the following year.

References

External links

ventricosus
Fungi described in 2013
Fungi of Asia